Müllner is a German surname. Notable people with the surname include:

Adolf Müllner (1774-1829), German critic and dramatic poet
Beatrix Müllner (born 1970), Austrian synchronized swimmer
Christine Müllner (born 1975), Austrian synchronized swimmer
Josef Müllner (1879-1968), Austrian sculptor

German-language surnames